Enander is a surname. Notable people with the surname include: 

Göran Enander (born 1955), Swedish politician
Samuel Enander (1607–1670), Swedish prelate